is a Japanese judoka. He won a bronze medal at the open category of the 2005 World Judo Championships.

He is from Kanagawa Prefecture. After graduation from Kokushikan University, he joined to Asahi Kasei which former world champions, Hiroshi Izumi and Masato Uchishiba also belong to.

Achievements

References

External links
 

Japanese male judoka
1982 births
Sportspeople from Kanagawa Prefecture
Living people
Asian Games medalists in judo
Judoka at the 2006 Asian Games
Asian Games bronze medalists for Japan
Medalists at the 2006 Asian Games
20th-century Japanese people
21st-century Japanese people